Badhal Union is a Union parishad of Kachua Upazila, Bagerhat District in Khulna Division of Bangladesh. It has an area of 52.11 km2 (20.12 sq mi) and a population of 17,875.

References

Unions of Kachua Upazila
Unions of Bagerhat District
Unions of Khulna Division